Milak, the Greenland Hunter (German: Milak, der Grönlandjäger) is a 1928 German silent adventure film directed by Georg Asagaroff and  and starring Ruth Weyher, Nils Focksen and Lotte Lorring.

Made by UFA, it was shot on location in Greenland.

Cast
 Ruth Weyher as Movie part  
 Nils Focksen as Movie part  
 Lotte Lorring as Movie part  
 Iris Arlan as Movie part  
 Helmer Hannsen as Movie part  
 Robby Robert as Movie part 
 Sepp Allgeier as Expeditionsteilnehmer - Himself  
 Richard Angst as Expeditionsteilnehmer - Himself  
 Harry Bellinghausen  as Expeditionsteilnehmer - Himself  
 Albert Benitz as Expeditionsteilnehmer - Himself  
 Waldemar Coste as Expeditionsteilnehmer - Himself  
  as Expeditionsleiter - Himself

References

Bibliography
 Bock, Hans-Michael & Bergfelder, Tim. The Concise Cinegraph: Encyclopaedia of German Cinema. Berghahn Books, 2009.
 Thomas, Douglas B. The early history of German motion pictures, 1895-1935. Thomas International, 1999.

External links

1928 films
Films of the Weimar Republic
German silent feature films
Films directed by Georg Asagaroff
Films set in Greenland
Films shot in Greenland
UFA GmbH films
German black-and-white films
1928 adventure films
German adventure films
Silent adventure films
1920s German films